Machairophyllum latifolium is a member of the family Aizoaceae, and is native to South Africa.

References
http://www.plantsystematics.org/taxpage/0/binomial/Machairophyllum_latifolium

Aizoaceae